Rarestonebowie is a compilation album by English musician David Bowie. This release was one in the series of mid-nineties releases by MainMan, Bowie's former management company during the seventies (other ones being Santa Monica '72 and the Ava Cherry & The Astronettes album People from Bad Homes). All these albums were released without Bowie's approval and are currently out of print.

Track listing
In 1995 Trident Music International released the Rarestonebowie compilation CD in the United Kingdom on the Golden Years label (Catalog # GY 014).

The pregap before track one, "All the Young Dudes", contains an RCA Records 1973 radio advertisement for the David Bowie album Pin Ups.

Rarestonebowie was reissued in Japan with Bonus tracks; by Dolphin Entertainment (Catalog # BLCK-86008) on 1998 August 19, and by Mecca Records (Catalog # BLCY-1019) on 2002 March 26.

References

David Bowie compilation albums
1995 compilation albums
Griffin Music albums